This is a list of members of the Privy Council of the United Kingdom appointed since the accession of King Charles III in 2022. Together with those appointed during the reign of Queen Elizabeth II who are still living, they make up the current membership of the Council.

The oldest Privy Counsellor is Sir Stephen Brown (born 1924, aged ). The earliest-appointed member is Lord Morris of Aberavon (1970). The youngest Privy Counsellor is Ranil Jayawardena (born 1986, aged ).

Charles III

2022 

Sir Clive Alderton (b. 1967)
Edward Argar (b. 1977)
Kemi Badenoch (b. 1980)
Simon Case (b. 1978)
David TC Davies (b. 1970)
Vicky Ford (b. 1967)
Dame Sarah Falk (b. 1962)
John Glen (b. 1974)
James Heappey (b. 1981)
Sir Mark Horner (b. 1956)
Ranil Jayawardena (b. 1986)
The Lord Kennedy of Southwark (b. 1962)
Gillian Keegan (b. 1968)
Stephen McPartland (b. 1976)
Wendy Morton  (b. 1967)
Chris Philp (b. 1976)
Victoria Prentis (b. 1971)
Jeremy Quin (b. 1966)
Rachel Reeves (b. 1979)
Chloe Smith (b. 1982)
Graham Stuart (b. 1962)
The Lord True (b. 1951)
Tom Tugendhat (b. 1973)

2023 
Maria Eagle (b. 1961)
 Marcus Jones (b. 1974)
 Kelly Tolhurst (b. 1978)
 Craig Whittaker (b. 1962)

References 

Lists of Privy Counsellors